KUNK (92.7 FM, "The Skunk FM') is an American radio station broadcasting an adult contemporary format. Licensed to Mendocino, California, United States, the station serves the Fort Bragg-Ukiah area. The station signed on as KMFB in November 1966.

In August 2011, the station was sold to Hooten Broadcasting, LLC. KMFB changed their call letters to KUNK on October 11, 2011.

Effective December 16, 2016, Hooten Broadcasting sold KUNK to Rubin Broadcasting, Inc. for $275,000.

Previous logo

References

External links

UNK
Radio stations established in 1966
1966 establishments in California
Mainstream adult contemporary radio stations in the United States